Clifford Rankin "Pat" Crawford, a.k.a. "Captain Pat", (January 28, 1902 – January 25, 1994) was a major league baseball player. He graduated from Sumter High School, class of 1919. Crawford graduated from Davidson College, and received his Masters Degree from The Ohio State University. He played baseball for several semi-pro and minor league teams throughout the 1920s including a stint as the left fielder for the 1922 Kinston Highwaymen in the Eastern Carolina Baseball Association, an independent or "outlaw league" team not affiliated with the National Association. Crawford got his big break in 1929 when he made it to the majors with the New York Giants, which were still being managed by the Hall of Famer John McGraw. On May 26, 1929, Crawford hit a pinch-hit grand slam off Socks Seibold in the sixth inning. Les Bell then hit a seventh-inning pinch-hit grand slam off Carl Hubbell. This was the only time in history that two pinch-hit grand slams were hit in the same game.  In 1931 and 1932, he had over 237 and 236 hits respectively for minor league Columbus, Ohio.  He went in and out of the majors through the 1934 season and was named league MVP of the American Association while playing for the Columbus Senators in 1932. In 1934, Crawford found himself playing on the world champion St. Louis Cardinals. The last two games of his major league career were World Series games. His teammates on the Gashouse Gang that year included HOFers Frankie Frisch, Leo Durocher, Joe Medwick, Dizzy Dean, and Burleigh Grimes. All told, Crawford had a .280 batting average with 9 home runs and 104 RBI in 318 major league games. He was one of the initial inductees in the Kinston Professional Baseball Hall of Fame on February 11, 1983.

Crawford died on January 25, 1994, in Morehead City, North Carolina, three days shy of what would have been his 92nd birthday. He was the last surviving member of the 1934 World Champion St. Louis Cardinals.

References

External links

1902 births
1994 deaths
People from Society Hill, South Carolina
New York Giants (NL) players
St. Louis Cardinals players
Cincinnati Reds players
Major League Baseball infielders
Davidson Wildcats baseball players
Davidson Wildcats men's basketball players
Guilford Quakers baseball coaches
Guilford Quakers football coaches
Baseball players from South Carolina
American Association (1902–1997) MVP Award winners
American men's basketball players